Henri Serre (born 26 February 1931) is a French actor who is best known for his role as Jim, a "vivid, melancholy, and finally tragic figure" in François Truffaut's Jules and Jim. Other appearances include The Fire Within, Section spéciale and Mister Frost.

Partial filmography
 Women of Paris (1953)
  Le combat dans l'ile  (1961)
 La Meule (short film) - René Allio, 1962)
 Jules et Jim (Jules and Jim, 1962)
 Il Processo di Veronal (1963)
 Le Feu follet (The Fire Within, Louis Malle, 1963)
 Atout cœur à Tokyo pour O.S.S. 117 (1966)
 Fantômas contre Scotland Yard (Fantomas Against Scotland Yard, 1967)
 Romance of a Horsethief (1971)
 Le Sourire vertical (1973)
 Section spéciale (Costa-Gavras, 1974)
 Club privé pour couples avertis (1974)
 Le Soulier de satin (1985)
 Je t'ai dans la peau (1990)

References

External links 

People from Sète
French male film actors
1931 births
Living people